Amiibo Tap: Nintendo's Greatest Bits (stylized as amiibo Tap: Nintendo's Greatest Bits), known as Amiibo Touch & Play: Nintendo Classics Highlights in the PAL regions, is an application developed and published by Nintendo for the Wii U, which is used for playing short demos of popular NES and Super NES video games by scanning Amiibo figurines.

Overview
The application allows the player to scan Amiibo figures with the Wii U GamePad to unlock demos of NES and Super NES games.  (Animal Crossing Amiibo cards are compatible for characters also released as Amiibo figures.) Each Amiibo figure randomly unlocks one game, which is tied to that specific amiibo. Each demo lasts three minutes and includes multiple scenes from the game, which are accessed by placing the same Amiibo to the GamePad to switch to the next scene. When each demo is finished, a link is given to purchase the game's Virtual Console version from the Nintendo eShop.

The list of NES games to unlock are as follows:

The list of SNES games to unlock are as follows:

Reception
PC Magazine rated the game 2/5 saying "each taste costs $13" and a "three-minute timer for each session" but liked the fact that "offers a taste of classic Nintendo games".
Nintendo Enthusiast gave the game a 7/10 while liked the fact "good selection of sequences, it's free" and "puts Amiibo to use", but they didn't like "common game selections, limited to amount of Amiibo you own, and 3 minute intervals can be very constricting".

Notes

References 

Video games that use Amiibo figurines
Nintendo games
Video games developed in Japan
Wii U games
Wii U-only games
Wii U eShop games
2015 video games